Aegomorphus pereirai is a species of beetle in the family Cerambycidae. It was described by Prosen and Lane in 1955.

References

Aegomorphus
Beetles described in 1955